Atias is a surname which may refer to:

Ariel Atias (born 1970), Israeli politician
Elan Atias (born 1975), American singer
Moran Atias (born 1981), American actress and model
Ron Atias (born 1975), Israeli taekwondoist

See also

Attia
Atia (disambiguation)
Attias
Ateas
Atiyah

Maghrebi Jewish surnames
Surnames of Moroccan origin
Lists of people by surname